Steven Barnes is an American television and film actor, television host, television and film producer, radio personality, and digital and social media executive. He is president of Barnes Creative Studios in Atlanta, Georgia, which specializes in digital marketing and social media strategy.

His acting career, which began in 1991, has comprised lead and supporting roles in several films, including The Joneses, Sex & Consequences, and No Witness. He has performed guest-starring and recurring roles in several television shows, including Drop Dead Diva, One Tree Hill, Prison Break, Matchpoint, Men On Pause, MTV’s Road Rules, Guiding Light, Ned & Stacey, As the World Turns, and The Young and the Restless. In 2009, Barnes created, starred in, and produced the television series High Rise. 

From 1994 to 2003, Barnes co-hosted the Atlanta morning radio show The Morning X with Barnes, Leslie & Jimmy on 99X WNNX with Leslie Fram and Jimmy Baron, earning Billboard Magazine’s National Major Market Morning Show Award in 1996 and Radio and Records’ National Major Market Morning Show of 1999. On January 5, 2023, Barnes returned to 99X Atlanta and relaunched "The Morning X" brand.

Early and personal life
Barnes grew up in Corpus Christi, Texas, and graduated from Mary Carroll High School in 1985. From 1998 to 2008, he was married to Stacey Sward and has 2 children from that marriage. In 2012, Barnes married Heather Searing Cook.

Credits

Radio
 KEXX, Corpus Christi, TX, 6-10 pm, 1984-1985
 KPEZ, Austin, TX, Swing Shift, 1986-1987
 KBTS, Austin, TX, Swing Shift, 1987-1990
 KISQ, Corpus Christi, TX, 6-10 am, 1989-1990
 KBEQ, Kansas City, MO, 6-10 pm, 1990-1992
 WNNX, Atlanta, GA, 6-10 am, The Morning X with Barnes, Leslie & Jimmy, 1992-2003
 WZGC, Atlanta, GA, 6-10 am, All Access with Barnes & Firfer, 2004-2006
 WRDA - weekends, Sept 2013–Present
 WNNX - 6-10 am, January 5, 2023 - Present

Film
The Joneses: Guy
Sex & Consequences: Rev. Jim
No Witness (feature): Paul Arkadian
No Witness (short): Leiter
Insanity: Tad Logan
The Number: Chip Harding
Losing Grace: Jeff
Remember the Titans: Titan Supporter
Irresistible Jimmy

Television
Stuff You Should Know: Flip Storminson
High Rise: Series creator, executive producer, series regular “Austin Prescott”
Drop Dead Diva: Gary Monroe
One Tree Hill: Starter
Prison Break (recurring): Agent Drucker
Matchpoint: Himself
Men on Pause: Douglas
MTV’s Road Rules: Himself
Guiding Light: Fireman
Ned & Stacey: Customer
As The World Turns: Perp
The Young & The Restless: Business Man
Saints & Sinners: Anthony
Your Honor: Jeremy
Government Records - The Rundown: Jack Aaron

Awards
Favorite Radio DJ – Creative Loafing Magazine, 1993, 1994, 1995, 1996, 1999, 2000
Best Radio Voice – Creative Loafing Magazine, 1996, 1997
Best Morning Show – Atlanta Magazine, 1996
National Major Market Morning Show - Billboard Magazine, 1996
Best Morning Show - Atlanta AIR Awards, 1996
Best Morning Show – Atlanta Press, 1999
National Major Market Morning Show Award – Radio & Records, 1999

References

External links 
Facebook
Twitter
Steve Barnes Official Site
High Rise the Series
Barnes Creative Studios

Living people
People from Corpus Christi, Texas
American talk radio hosts
Television producers from Texas
American male film actors
American male television actors
Year of birth missing (living people)